89 Virginis is a single star in the zodiac constellation of Virgo, located 234 light years from the Sun. It is visible to the naked eye as a dim, orange-hued star with an apparent visual magnitude of 4.959. The star is moving closer to the Earth with a heliocentric radial velocity of −39 km/s.

This is an evolved giant star with a stellar classification of K0 III, having exhausted the hydrogen at its core and expanded away from the main sequence. It is a red clump star, which indicates it is generating energy through helium fusion at its core. This object is 3.4 billion years old with 1.7 times the mass of the Sun and 12 times the Sun's radius. It is radiating 69 times the Sun's luminosity from its enlarged photosphere at an effective temperature of 4706 K.

References

K-type giants
Horizontal-branch stars
Virgo (constellation)
Durchmusterung objects
Virginis, 089
9460
120452
067494
5196